Sergey Kornilayev (born 20 February 1955) is a Russian former wrestler who competed in the 1980 Summer Olympics.

References

1955 births
Living people
Soviet male sport wrestlers
Olympic wrestlers of the Soviet Union
Wrestlers at the 1980 Summer Olympics
Russian male sport wrestlers
Olympic bronze medalists for the Soviet Union
Olympic medalists in wrestling
Medalists at the 1980 Summer Olympics